Bhupinder Singh (born Bhupinder Soin, 6 February 1940 – 18 July 2022) was an Indian musician, a ghazal singer and also a Bollywood playback singer.

Early life
Bhupinder Singh was born in Amritsar, Punjab to Natha Singhji, a musician and his introducer to music. Bhupinder's father was a stern teacher, and at one point, he detested music and its instruments.

Music career
Singh started his career as a casual artist for All India Radio under the direction of Satish Bhatia. He also worked at Doordarshan Center, New Delhi. He also learnt guitar. In 1962, music director Madan Mohan heard him at a dinner hosted by Satish Bhatia in his honour (Satish Bhatia was Producer in AIR Delhi and Singh was working under him as a guitarist), and called him to Bombay. He was given the opportunity to sing the song Hoke Majboor Mujhe Usne Bulaya Hoga alongside Mohammed Rafi, Talat Mahmood and Manna Dey in Chetan Anand's Haqeeqat. He was given a solo by Khayyam in film Aakhri Khat. Singh's voice is one of the most unique in playback singing. He has sung a few popular duets with Kishore Kumar and Mohammed Rafi.

Thereafter, Singh started releasing private albums wherein his first LP had three self-composed songs and was released in 1968, a second LP of ghazals wherein he introduced the Spanish guitar, bass and drums to the ghazal style, released in 1978 and his third LP titled Woh Jo Shair Tha, for which the lyrics were written by Gulzar in 1980.

Entering wedlock with Bangladeshi singer Mitali, he stopped playback singing in the mid-1980s and began singing jointly for several albums and live concerts. Together, they produced many ghazal and geet cassettes. 

His famous songs include "Dil Dhoondta hai", "Do diwane shahar mein", "Naam gum jayega", "Karoge yaad to", "Thodi si Zameen Thoda Aasman", "Meethe bol bole", "Kabhi kisi ko mukammal", "Kisi nazar ko tera intezaar aaj bhi", and "Ek akela is Shehar Mein". He sang the song Duniya Chute Yaar Na Toote picturized on Rajesh Khanna. R. D. Burman made him sing songs like Raat Banoo Mein Geet Bano Tum, Naam Gum Jayega, Kahiya Kahan Se Aana Hua and Beete Na Bitaai Raina which made him famous.

Personal life

In the 80s, Bhupinder married the Bangladeshi singer Mitali Mukherjee. Together, they performed ghazal on Doordarshan and concerts. They have a son named Nihal Singh who is also a musician.

At the age of 82, Singh died of a cardiac arrest on 18 July 2022. He suffered from COVID-19 and colon cancer was also suspected.

Discography

Popular songs

As guitarist
 Dum Maro Dum (Hare Rama Hare Krishna), composed by Rahul Dev Burman
 Ek Hi Khwaab, composed by Rahul Dev Burman
 Waadiyaan Meraa Daaman (Abhilasha), composed by Rahul Dev Burman
 Chura liya hai (Yaadon Ki Baaraat), composed by Rahul Dev Burman
 Chingari Koi Bhadke (Amar Prem), composed by Rahul Dev Burman
 Chalte Chalte (Chalte Chalte), composed by Bappi Lahiri
 Mehbooba O Mehbooba (Sholay), composed by Rahul Dev Burman
 Ambar ki ek paak surahi (Kadambari), composed by Ustad Vilayat Khan
 Tum jo mil gaye ho (Hanste Zakhm), composed by Madan Mohan

As playback singer
 "Hoke Majboor Mujhe Usne Bulaya Hoga", composed by Madan Mohan
 "Aane Se Uske Aaye Bahar" from the movie Jeene Ki Raah (1969) with Mohammed Rafi (Music composed by Laxmikant-Pyarelal)
 "Duniya Chhute Yaar Na Chhute" from the movie Dharam Kanta (1982) with Mohammed Rafi (Music composed by Naushad)
 "Kisi Nazar Ko Tera Intezar Aaj Bhi Hai" from the movie Aitbaar (1985) with Asha Bhosle (Music composed by Bappi Lahiri)
 "Awaaz Di Hai Aaj Ek Nazar Ne" from the movie Aitbaar (1985) with Asha Bhosle (Music composed by Bappi Lahiri)
 "Thodi Si Zameen Thoda Aasman" from the movie Sitara (1980) with Lata Mangeshkar (Music composed by R. D. Burman) 
 "Gulab Jism Ka", film  Anjuman (1986) (composed by Khayyam)
 "Beeti Na Beetai Raina", film Parichay (1972) (composed by Rahul Dev Burman)
 "Dil Dhoondta Hai", film Mausam (1975) (composed by Madan Mohan)
 "Naam Gum Jayega", film Kinara (1977) (composed by Rahul Dev Burman)
 "Ek Akela Is Shaher Mein", film Gharonda (composed by Jaidev)
 "Daro Deewar Pe/Khush Raho Ahle Vatan Andolan (1977) composed by Jaidev
 "Huzoor Is Kadar bhi na Itra ke Chaliye" (movie:-Maasoom), composed by Rahul Dev Burman
 "Hothon Pe Aisi Baat" Jewel Thief (1967) composed by Sachin Dev Burman
 "Kaise Kahoon kuch kaina sakoon" from Tamil film Nandu 1981, composed by Ilayaraja
 "Tum say jo bat hui tum say jo mulaqat hui" (composed by Uttam-Jagdesh)
 "Baadalon se Kaat Kaat ke" from the movie Satya (1998) (composed by Vishal Bharadwaj)
 "Karoge Yaad to Har Baat Yaad Aayegi" from the movie Bazaar (1982) composed by Khayyam
 "Kabhi Kisi Ko Mukammal Jahan nahi milta" from the movie Ahista Ahista (1981) (composed by Khayyam)
 "Rut Jawan Jawan" from the movie Aakhri Khat (composed by Khayyam)
 "Layee Hayaat Aye Qaza Le Chali Chale" { Bhupinder Singh } Ibrahim Zauq *Mirza Ghalib
 "Zindagi Zindagi Mere Ghar Aanaa", film Dooriyaan (1979) (composed by Jaidev)
 "Soorajmukhi Tera Pyar Anokha Hai", film "Sooraj Mukhi" (1992), lyrics by Shardanand Tiwary and composed by Ajay Swami.

References

External links
 
 Ramprasad Bismil at hindigeetmala.com
 Official Website 

1940 births
2022 deaths
Bollywood playback singers
Indian male playback singers
Indian male ghazal singers
Indian guitarists
Musicians from Amritsar
Singers from Punjab, India
20th-century Indian male singers
20th-century Indian singers
21st-century Indian male singers
21st-century Indian singers
Deaths from the COVID-19 pandemic in India